Rickie Joseph Grover (born 24 December 1961) is an English actor and comedian. He is best known for his role in EastEnders as Andrew Cotton as well as voicing Yangus in the Dragon Quest series. His stepfather was an armed robber and his mother a hairdresser. Grover became a ladies' hairdresser and a champion boxer, with the nickname Ricky 'Goodnight' Grover due to his big punching power. He then became a stand-up comedian, actor and occasional television presenter. Grover is dyslexic and could not read or write until his early thirties.

Early  life
Grover was born in West Ham, Essex. He started boxing at the age of 6 and started boxing professionally at 22 where he became a European super-lightweight champion and a British welterweight champion.

Acting career
Grover has appeared in television programmes including Red Dwarf, Fist of Fun, 'Orrible, The 11 O'Clock Show, Honky Sausages and Black Books. He also provided the voice acting for the character of Yangus in the English language version of the PlayStation 2 game Dragon Quest VIII.

His 1996 short film Punch won the Silver Bear Award at the Berlin International Film Festival.

In 1998 he featured in the music video for the England song Vindaloo by "Fat Les".

In 2000, he won the Best Actor award at the Brest European Short Film Festival for his performance in Hungry (1998).
One of his most regular characters is "Bulla", a violent offender who originally featured on The 11 O'Clock Show and was interviewed by Michael Parkinson. He had a guest appearance in Top Buzzer. In 2011 he starred and co-wrote the feature-length film Big Fat Gypsy Gangster with his wife, Maria Grover.

He has appeared in adverts for Virgin Mobile and Beagle Street Insurance.

Since July 2009 he has played the part of Matron Hilary Loftus in the BAFTA award-winning BBC Four medical 'docu-sitcom' Getting On, directed by Peter Capaldi.
He had a role in the vampire film Dead Cert and in the horror drama Tony, which was released in UK cinemas on 5 February 2010.

Grover also had a role in an episode of Not Going Out in 2011, playing a drug-dealing butcher.

Grover reprised the role of Yangus in the 2015 videogame Dragon Quest Heroes: The World Tree's Woe and the Blight Below.

Presenting career
In 2006, Grover presented the documentary F*** Off I'm Fat as part of BBC Three's first "Body Image" season. In 2007 he presented a peak-time Tonight With Trevor McDonald report on obesity and a BBC Two episode of Grandad's Back in Business in which he mentored two stand-up comedians.

Writing
From July 2003, Grover wrote a column, "Raging Bulla", for the monthly magazine Loaded until its final issue in 2015.

Filmography

Film and TV
Fist of Fun (1995)
Punch (1996)
Bring Me the Head of Mavis Davis (1997)
Hungry (1998)
Red Dwarf (1999), as Baxter
Love, Honour and Obey (2000)
The 11 O'Clock Show (2000), as Bulla
Black Books (2002), as Danny Spudge
Revolver (2005)
Cargo (2006)
Tony (2009)
Getting On (2009–2012)
Big Fat Gypsy Gangster (2010)
Not Going Out (2011)
EastEnders (2011–12)
Being Human (2013)
Citizen Khan (2016)
Zapped (2016–2017)
Porridge (2016–2017)
This Way Up (2019)
After Life (2021)
Vengeance Is Mine (2021)

Video game roles
Dragon Quest VIII: Journey of the Cursed King – Yangus
Dragon Quest Heroes: The World Tree's Woe and the Blight Below - Yangus

Books
 Sit-Down Comedy (contributor to anthology, ed Malcolm Hardee & John Fleming), Ebury Press/Random House, 2003.  .

References

External links

Bulla's official YouTube channel

1961 births
Living people
English male film actors
English stand-up comedians
English male television actors
English television presenters
English male voice actors
People from West Ham
20th-century English male actors
21st-century English male actors
Male actors from London
Comedians from London
English male comedians
English male boxers
People with dyslexia